Rinaldo Rinaldi (April 13, 1793 – July 28, 1873) was an Italian sculptor.

Biography
He was born in Padua. His parents were Teresa dei Conti Pisani and Domenico. At the age of eight he learned the trade of wood carving from his father. By the age of 14, he began carving in stone. By age 18, he was sent to study at the Accademia di Belle Arti in Venice under Leopoldo Cicognara and Matteini. A year later, he received a stipend to work in Rome, where he became a pupil of Canova in Rome. After the death of his master, Rinaldi attempted to occupy the same studio Canova had used for 30 years. In 1849, he joined the municipal council of the brief Roman Republic. After the papal restoration, he was briefly jailed. He completed the Monument to Pietro Fortunato Calvi, one of the Belfiore martyrs, unveiled in 1872 in Noale near the tower of the Clock Tower. He became dean of the Accademia di San Luca in Rome.  He became Honorary member of the Accademia di Belle Arti of Venice in 1823, of the Academy in Rome in 1823, and the Virtuosi del Panteon in 1832, of the Academy of Fine Arts of Philadelphia in 1863. Pius IX decorated him with the Order of St Gregory and King Vittorio Emanuele II knighted him as cavalier of the Order of the Crown of Italy. He died in Rome.

Among his works are:
Erminia
 Moïse d'après Michel-Ange 
Armida
La Ninfa Egeria
Penelope che consegna ai Proci l'arco di Ulisse
Ulisse recognized by his dog
Metabo, King of the Volscians, consacra Camilla sulle sponde dell'Amaseno
Cassandra
Group of Vergini
Justice and Peace
Cerere che insegna a Tirotolemo l'uso dell'aratro
Resurrection
Eve and Abel
Lost Time
Gained Time

References

 Roma Artistica, Pubblicazione Mensile, Illustrata; Volume 1, Number 12; Editor: Architetto Raffaello Ojetti, 1872 Tipografia Romana di C. Bartoli, Piazza Poli #7-13; page 89-92.

1793 births
1873 deaths
18th-century Neapolitan people
Italian sculptors
Italian male sculptors
Accademia di Belle Arti di Venezia alumni
19th-century Neapolitan people